Michael Kölbl (born 20 November 1986, in Austria) is an Austrian football player currently playing for SV Lafnitz. He has previously played for TSV Hartberg.

Honours

Club
TSV Hartberg
Austrian Regionalliga Central (1): 2008-09

SV Lafnitz
Austrian Regionalliga Central (1) 2017-18

References

1986 births
Austrian footballers
Association football midfielders
SV Lafnitz players
TSV Hartberg players
Living people